Govşatlı (also Govshatlu, Govshatly, Qovşatlı and Kovshat) is a village in the Fuzuli District of Azerbaijan.

References 

Populated places in Fuzuli District